The 1975 McNeese State Cowboys football team represented McNeese State University as a member of the Southland Conference in the 1975 NCAA Division I football season. Led by sixth-year head coach Jack Doland, the Cowboys compiled an overall record of 7–4 with a mark of 3–2 in conference play, placing third in the Southland.  McNeese State played home games at Cowboy Stadium in Lake Charles, Louisiana.

The team's statistical leaders included Johnnie Thibodeaux with 1,071 passing yards, Gary Broussard with 314 receiving yards, and Mike McArthur with 787 rushing yards.

Schedule

Roster

References

McNeese State
McNeese Cowboys football seasons
McNeese State Cowboys football